Like Lambs is an independent action and horror film written and directed by Ted Marcus. It was released in 2016 at the Atlanta Film Festival, and also presented at the Boston International Film Festival.

Synopsis 
During an economic collapse, boarding school students find corruption cases involving elite bankers. In revolt, they devise a plan to compel a bourgeois to release money or watch their children die on national television.

Cast 
 Liam Aiken	...	Charlie Masters
 Ted Marcus	...	Sebastian Dollarhyde
 Justin Chon	...	Jasper Cho
 Connor Paolo	...	Mick Springfield
 Lindsay Keys	...	Rebecca Fitzpatrick
 Chanelle Peloso	...	Dahlia Fitzpatrick
 Morgan Schuler	... Bat #2
 Liz Butler	... Witch with the Cauldron

Production 
The film was shot over the fall of 2013 in a gothic castle in New England. 35mm films were used that remained from the productions of 12 Years a Slave and The Wolf of Wall Street. To finish the production, about 33 thousand dollars were collected in the Kickstarter.

References

Kickstarter-funded films
American independent films
2010s English-language films
American action horror films
American horror thriller films
2016 horror films
2016 action films
2016 thriller films